This is a list of Category A listed buildings in the Old Town of Edinburgh, Scotland.

For the main list, see List of Category A listed buildings in Edinburgh.

Boundaries

The Old Town is defined here as the area around the Royal Mile, shown in dark brown on the map to the right. As well as the Royal Mile, it encompasses the Grassmarket, Cowgate, and Canongate areas, along with a number of areas with predominantly more modern construction.

 to the north, the southern edge of Princes Street Gardens, Waterloo Place and Regent Road
This excludes the lower parts of the Mound, with a boundary running approximately along Market Street. This omits Princes Street Gardens and Waverley Station, as well as the Balmoral Hotel and the old Post Office building at the north end of North Bridge. However, other structures on the southern side of Waterloo Place/Regent Road are included.
 to the west, Lothian Road
The north-western boundary point is the junction of Lothian Road and King's Stables Road, with all structures east of Lothian Road included. The boundary runs south along Lothian Road to its junction with Lauriston Place at Tollcross. The southwestern corner – between Lauriston Place and East Fountainbridge, up to Lady Lawson Road – is considered the Old Town for the purposes of this list, but is not included in the UNESCO "Edinburgh Old and New Towns" World Heritage Site listing.
 to the east, Holyrood and the Queen's Park
The northeastern limit is Regent Road Park, at the junction of Regent Road and the southern end of Easter Road. The eastern boundary runs down Abbeyhill to the Palace of Holyroodhouse – which is included in the Old Town – to the southeastern limit, approximately at the new Scottish Parliament building.
 to the south, Lauriston Place, South College Street, Drummond Street, and Holyrood Road
From the southeastern limit, the boundary runs west along Holyrood Road to the junction with the Pleasance, moves south slightly, and again runs west along Drummond Street and South College Street, along the southern edge of the Old College building. The boundary then follows Lothian Street, Teviot Place, and Lauriston Place to its junction at Tollcross. The Lauriston Place boundary means that the Old Town includes George Heriot's and the College of Art, but does not include the old Royal Infirmary site.

Listed buildings 

|}

Notes

References

Bibliography

 Old Town Conservation Area Character Appraisal, Edinburgh City Council, n.d. (PDF)
 Richard Fawcett, Scottish Architecture: From the Accession of the Stewarts to the Reformation, 1371-1560, Edinburgh University Press, 1994
 Richard Fawcett, Scottish Medieval Churches: Architecture & Furnishings, The History Press, 2002
 Miles Glendinning, The Architecture of Scottish Government: From Kingship to Parliamentary Democracy, Dundee University Press, 2004
 George Hay, The Architecture of Scottish Post-Reformation Churches. 1560-1843, Clarendon, 1957
 Louisa Humm, John Lowrey, The Architecture of Scotland, 1660-1750, Edinburgh University Press, 2020
 Tolbooths and Townhouses: Civic Architecture In Scotland To 1833,  RCAHMS, 1987
 Jim Johnson, Lou Rosenburg, Renewing Old Edinburgh, Argyll Publishing, 2010
 Ray McKenzie, Public Sculpture of Edinburgh (Volume 1): The Old Town and South Edinburgh, Liverpool University Press, 2018

Edinburgh
Category A listed buildings
Old Town, Edinburgh